...Barefootsoul is the fourth studio album from Sonia Dada, released in 2002.

Track listing

References

2002 albums
Sonia Dada albums